Glory Jane (lit. "Young-kwang's Jae-in" or Man of Honor) is a 2011 South Korean television drama series, starring Chun Jung-myung, Park Min-young, and Lee Jang-woo. The series follows the romantic and professional trials of an aspiring nurse and two baseball players as they strive for their love and dreams. It aired on KBS2 from October 12 to December 29, 2011 on Wednesdays and Thursdays at 21:55 for 24 episodes.

Synopsis
Yoon Jae-in (Park Min-young) is a hardworking nurse who does not remember her past. In fact she is the daughter of Yoon Il-goo (Ahn Nae-sang) who was the president of a trading company. Yoon Il-goo was killed in a car accident orchestrated by his friend Seo Jae-myung (Son Chang-min), to make sure that Jae-myung takes over control of the company.  When Jae-in's mother Eun-joo (Jang Young-nam) received news of her husband's accident she took Jae-in and drove to the hospital. However, due to heavy rain, they got into a car accident caused by Jae-myung's goons, which separated the mother and daughter. Jae-myung ordered Kim In-bae (Lee Ki-yeol) who works as his chauffeur to send Jae-in, who had lost all of her memories at the time, to an orphanage, where In-bae told her to never forget her name. 17 years later, In-bae's son, Young-kwang (Chun Jung-myung), is a baseball player and one of the league's most promising sluggers, but he's since been demoted to the minors. He had a fallout with his rival, Jae-myung's son, Seo In-woo (Lee Jang-woo), who not only comes from a rich family but is currently the league's top star. While injured, Young-kwang meets Jae-in, and she saves him with a blood transfusion. Under Jae-myung's orders, In-bae is chased and killed in an accident orchestrated by his goons, to prevent In-bae from revealing Jae-myung's dark secrets. Young-kwang decides to quit being a baseball player and owning his father's noodle shop. Jae-in also quits her job as a nurse to find a job with Young-kwang. In-woo finds himself disowned by his father, and the three of them apply for jobs at Jae-myung's office. Young-kwang and In-woo continue to vie for Jae-in's affections in a bitter rivalry that goes far back to their childhoods. Seo In-chul (Park Sung-woong) also enters their lives; his lover is Kim Kyung-joo (Kim Yun-joo), who happens to be Young-kwang's runaway sister. Then Eun-joo awakens from her coma.

Cast

Main characters
Chun Jung-myung as Kim Young-kwang 
Ahn Do-gyu as young Young-kwang 
Park Min-young as Yoon Jae-in 
Ahn Eun-jung as young Jae-in 
Lee Jang-woo as Seo In-woo 
Kim Ji-hoon as young In-woo 
Lee Jin as Cha Hong-joo

Supporting characters
Son Chang-min as Seo Jae-myung
Park Sung-woong as Seo In-chul
Choi Myung-gil as Park Gun-ja
Lee Ki-young as Kim In-bae
 as Kim Kyung-joo
Nam Bo-ra as Kim Jin-joo
Jung Hye-sun as Oh Soon-nyeo
 as Im Jung-ok
Lee Moon-sik as Heo Young-do
Kim Sung-oh as Joo Dae-sung
 as Go Kil-dong
Ahn Nae-sang as Yoon Il-goo
Jang Young-nam as Yeo Eun-joo
 as Coach Choi
Choi Ran as Director of nursing service
 as Oh Jung-hae

Ratings

Source: TNS Media Korea

Awards and nominations

References

External links
  
 
 
 

2011 South Korean television series debuts
2011 South Korean television series endings
Korean Broadcasting System television dramas
Korean-language television shows
Baseball television series
Television shows written by Kang Eun-kyung
South Korean romance television series
Television series by Kim Jong-hak Production